Leptodactylus marmoratus, commonly known as the marbled tropical bullfrog, is a common species of frog in the family Leptodactylidae. It is commonly found under and on the surface of dead leaf litter and dead branches.

Behavior and diet
This bullfrog has a distinctive call that they sound from dusk to dawn as they're nocturnal. They feed on isopods, ants, and insect larvae that are found in abundance in their habitats.

Distribution
It is endemic to southern Brazil in the states of Minas Gerais, Rio de Janeiro, São Paulo and Paraná. Its natural habitats are subtropical or tropical moist lowland forests, subtropical or tropical moist montane forests, and rural gardens. It is threatened by habitat loss caused by agriculture and human intrusion but is considered to be a least concern.

References 

marmoratus
Endemic fauna of Brazil
Amphibians described in 1867
Taxonomy articles created by Polbot
Taxobox binomials not recognized by IUCN